United Bank Limited (UBL) is a Pakistani multinational commercial bank which is a subsidiary of British company Bestway Group. It is based in Karachi, Pakistan. It is one of the largest banks in the Pakistani private sector, with over 1,400 branches across Pakistan, 19 branches overseas, and a customer base exceeding 4 million.

The bank has an asset base in excess of $15 billion, a global workforce of almost 13,233 people and a diversified client base covering a broad spectrum of segments and industries across the globe. UBL provides services in wholesale and retail banking through its network of branches and presence across 12 countries in four continents including the UAE, Bahrain, Qatar, Yemen, UK, Switzerland, China, Oman, US, Tanzania, Iran and Pakistan.

For the year 2020, UBL was designated domestic systemically important bank (D-SIB) by the State Bank of Pakistan.

History

Agha Hasan Abedi founded the bank in November 1958 and under his leadership, it became the second largest bank in Pakistan. In 1974, the Government of Pakistan nationalized the bank. This, in turn, led to Agha Hasan Abedi founding the Bank of Credit and Commerce International. 

In 2002, the Government of Pakistan sold 51 percent shares of the bank to a consortium of Abu Dhabi Group and Bestway. Also, the bank merged its operations in the UK with those belonging to National Bank of Pakistan to form United National Bank Limited. United Bank owns 55% of the joint-venture and National Bank of Pakistan owns the remainder.

In August 2003, UBL launched Pakistan's first derivative money market product. In 2005, the bank acquired the status of Authorised Derivative Dealer – the only domestic bank to achieve this status. It is also the first institution from Pakistan & third in South Asia to be accredited with Primary Membership of International Swaps & Derivatives Association.

In June 2007 the Global Depository Receipts of UBL were listed on the London Stock Exchange. The offering targeted institutional investors and raised in excess of US$650 million. UBL is the only Pakistani bank and one of the only two Pakistani companies that are listed on the London Stock Exchange.

In April 2010, UBL launched UBL Omni, an in-house developed project designed to provide banking facilities to the unbanked population of Pakistan.  As of June 2014 UBL Omni had a customer base in excess of 6.8 million, with over 1.5 million active cards in issue and 5 million monthly transactions valued at over US$253 million. Through the success of UBL Omni 1.55 million previously unbanked individuals have opened mobile bank accounts with UBL in Pakistan. Today, Omni Dukaan network has grown to 42,100 agents in Pakistan.

In January 2011 Choudrey played an instrumental role in the Group's decision to increase its shareholding in (UBL) to 51.07% by acquiring an additional 20% of the shares from the Abu Dhabi Group. This was a total investment of US$230.0 million in Pakistan's second largest private commercial bank.

The Bank added 200 branches in 2011 and 2012, thus increasing its domestic network to over 1,300 online branches with 800 ATMs.

In June 2012, UBL led consortium acquired 67.4% stake in Khushhali Bank, which is the largest micro-finance institution in Pakistan.

In December 2013, the Group, increased its shareholding in UBL to 61.37% by acquiring an additional 10.3% of the shares from the Abu Dhabi Group. Through an investment of over $120 million, the Group acquired the entire shareholding of its former joint venture partner the Abu Dhabi Group.

In June 2014, the Government of Pakistan sold its remaining 20% stake in UBL for US$387 million. This was Pakistan's first transaction in the global equity market in almost eight years.

In June 2014, the government sold-off its remaining 19.8 percent shares in the bank for $387 million ($310m of which was in foreign exchange). 

In November 2018, UBL announced that it was voluntarily shutting down its New York City branch due to it being commercially nonviable to operate.

UBL POS terminals
United Bank Limited in an effort to increase its outreach in the market of Pakistan has done contract with Access Group to activate DigitalPass – POS terminals. DigitalPass is the part of Access Group and has a presence in over 200 cities and towns of the country serving the needs of different merchants. As per this contract, UBL will be provided provision of POS terminals by Access Group to relatively boost the presence of banking activities. It will also help in enhancing the bank’s outreach in terms of POS terminal based Network.

Being the largest bank in the private sector, UBL has over 1,390 branches nationwide and 18 branches outside Pakistan. It has a customer base of more than 4 million, leading the financial and banking services in the country.

Online banking 

Muhammad Shafiq khan The Ex-president of UBL thought it prudent to initiate UBL’s online banking. Through this facility, customers are able to access their account from more than 1200 branches located in 150 cities across Pakistan. Transactions such as Cash Deposit, Cheque Encashment, Stop Payment, Account Statement, Funds Transfer, Bill Payments are done online without the need to travel to the local branch.

Awards and honors
In May 2016, UBL was adjudged ‘Best Bank 2016’ at the first Pakistan Banking Awards held under the auspices of the Institute of Bankers Pakistan. The ‘Best Bank’ category recognizes a bank that has demonstrated the most significant contribution to national development and the most effective management of its resources including its employees, clients, franchise, community, and financials.

Also in 2016, JCR-VIS Credit Rating Company Limited (JCR-VIS) has upgraded the entity ratings of United Bank Limited (UBL) to ‘AAA/A-1+’ (Triple A/A-One Plus). The year also saw the UBL Facebook page exceeding 1 Million likes, making it the first Pakistani bank to cross a million fans on Facebook. The achievement reinforces its reputation as a Progressive and Innovative bank.

UBL has become the only bank to win the Pakistan Stock Exchange (PSX) “Top Companies of the Year” Award for three consecutive years (2016-18). The awards for the three years, were presented at a ceremony held in Karachi recently. The Prime Minister of Pakistan, Mr. Imran Khan, who was the Chief Guest at the event, gave away the awards. Ms. Sima Kamil, former President and CEO UBL, received the awards from the Prime Minister Mr. Imran Khan, on behalf of the Bank.

Profitability 
United Bank profit during 1HCY20 stood at Rs10.9 billion.

FinCEN 
United Bank was named in the FinCEN Files, published by BuzzFeed News and the International Consortium of Investigative Journalists (ICIJ). It had eight suspicious transactions from 2011 to 2012 flagged, totaling to $399,620.

Other subsidiaries 
 UBL Fund Managers Limited
 UBL Insurers Limited
 UBL OMNI

See also 
 United Bank Limited cricket team

References

External links
 UBL Digital App

 Banks of Pakistan
 Companies based in Karachi
 Companies listed on the Pakistan Stock Exchange
Pakistani subsidiaries of foreign companies
 Banks established in 1959
2002 mergers and acquisitions
Formerly government-owned companies of Pakistan
Multinational companies headquartered in Pakistan
Pakistani companies established in 1959